Epalxiphora is a genus of moths belonging to the subfamily Tortricinae of the family Tortricidae. This genus was first described by Edward Meyrick in 1881 and is endemic to New Zealand.

Species
Epalxiphora axenana Meyrick, 1881

See also
List of Tortricidae genera

References

Archipini
Tortricidae genera